While the City Sleeps... is a 1986 studio album by George Benson, released on Warner Bros. Records. It features musicians like Paulinho da Costa, Preston Glass, Paul Jackson, Jr., Marcus Miller and Narada Michael Walden (as drummer and producer), alongside young talents of the time like Kenny G, Randy Jackson and Kashif. Although it does not have any instrumental tracks, Benson's guitar playing is somewhat in the headlight in songs like "Love Is Here Tonight", "Teaser" and "Too Many Times". The most successful single of the album, "Kisses in the Moonlight", is still frequently played by Benson at live performances and is present on many of his compilation albums (The Best of George Benson, The George Benson Anthology, The Essential Selection, etc.) On the B-side of the "Kisses in the Moonlight" single – alongside "Breezin'" (Special Mix) on the 12" version – is the instrumental song "Open Your Eyes" (George Benson/Ronnie Foster) (producer: Tommy LiPuma, engineer: Eric Calvi) which is not available elsewhere.

Shortly after the album's release, Benson performed "Love Is Here Tonight" in its entirety while guest starring in season three of the detective show Mickey Spillane's Mike Hammer.

Reception

Like many of Benson's pop albums, While the City Sleeps... was criticized for the absence of his distinctive jazz guitar instrumentals.

Track listing

Personnel 
Adapted from the album's liner notes.

Musicians:

 George Benson – lead vocals, lead guitar
 Robbie Buchanan – keyboards (1, 8), synthesizers (1, 8), synth bass (1, 8), arrangements (1, 8)
 Andrew Thomas – PPG Waveterm synthesizer programming (1, 8)
 Frank Martin – synthesizers (2)
 Preston Glass – synthesizers (2), bass sequencing (2, 3), percussion programming (2), keyboards (3, 4), strings (3), drum programming (3), Roland TR-808 programming (4), additional drum programming (7)
 Walter Afanasieff – keyboards (3), additional keyboards (5), synthesizers (7)
 Cory Lerios – keyboards (5), synth bass sequencing (5)
 Sterling Smith – synth horns (5)
 Kashif – keyboards (6), all other instruments (6), rhythm arrangements (6)
 Greg Phillinganes – keyboards (6), rhythm arrangements (6)
 Larry Smith – Synclavier programming (6)
 John S. Dranchak – assistant Synclavier programming (6)
 Paul Jackson Jr. – rhythm guitar (1, 8)
 Alan Glass – rhythm guitar (3)
 Corrado Rustici – Charvel GTM6 MIDI guitar synthesizer (4)
 David Jenkins – rhythm guitar (5), backing vocals (5)
 Paul Pesco – guitar (6)
 Chris Camozzi – rhythm guitar (7)
 Marcus Miller – bass (1)
 Randy Jackson – Fender bass (4), Moog Source (7)
 John Robinson – drums (1, 8)
 Narada Michael Walden – drum programming (2, 4, 7), arrangements (2-5, 7), drums (3, 5)
 Yogi Horton – drums (6)
 Paulinho da Costa – percussion (1, 8)
 Gigi Gonaway – Simmons toms (2), Paiste cymbal (2, 7), Simmons drum fills  (7)
 Kenny G – saxophone (1, 8)
 Jerry Hey – string arrangements (2, 4, 7)
 Ralph Schuckett – string arrangements (6)
 Janey Clewer – backing vocals (1, 8)
 Jim Gilstrap – backing vocals (1, 3, 4, 7, 8)
 Marlena Jeter – backing vocals (1)
 John Lehman – backing vocals (1, 8)
 Claytoven Richardson – backing vocals (2, 3, 4, 7)
 Kitty Beethoven – backing vocals (3, 4, 7)
 Jennifer Hall – backing vocals (3, 4, 5, 7)
 Suzanne Valentine – backing vocals (3)
 Bud Cockrell – backing vocals (5)
 Carolyn Hedrich – backing vocals (5)
 Cindy Mizelle – backing vocals (6)
 Audrey Wheeler – backing vocals (6)

Production

 Elliot Scheiner – engineer (1, 8)
 Eric Calvi – mix engineer (1, 8)
 David Frazer – chief and mix engineer (2-5, 7)
 Darrell Gustamachio – recording and mix engineer (6)
 Peter Doell – aeditional recording (1, 8)
 Eddie Garcia – assistant engineer (1, 8)
 Joe Martin – assistant engineer (1, 8)
 Jay Rifkin – additional recording (1, 8)
 Michael O'Reilly – additional recording (1)
 Victor Beyglio – assistant engineer (2-5, 7)
 Dana Chappelle – assistant engineer (2-5, 7)
 Stuart Hirotsu – assistant engineer (2-5, 7)
 Gordon Lyon – assistant engineer (2-5, 7), keyboard engineer (5)
 Lincoln Clapp – vocal and guitar engineer (3)
 Larry Smith – assistant engineer (6)
 John S. Dranchak – studio assistant (6)
 Kevin Wallace – studio assistant (6)
 Greg Calbi – mastering at Sterling Sound (New York, NY).
 Larry Fishman – production coordinator (1, 8)
 Janice Lee – production coordinator (2-5, 7)
 Cynthia Shilow – production coordinator (2-5, 7)
 Russell Sidelsky – production coordinator (6)
 Nancy Y. Mallory – project assistant (6)
 Lu Snead – project coordinator
 Kav DeLuxe – art direction and design
 Caroline Greyshock – photography
 Hugo Boss – clothing
 Jeff Sayre – clothing
 Fritz/Turner Management, L.A. – direction

Charts

Certifications

References 

George Benson albums
1986 albums
Albums produced by Narada Michael Walden
Albums produced by Tommy LiPuma
Warner Records albums